Juan Alighieri  was an Argentine film actor.

Filmography
Almafuerte (1949)
El Seductor (1950) .... Julián Rosales 2
Suburb (1951)
Derecho viejo (1951)
La Dama del mar (1954)
Los Problemas de papá (1954)
La Calle del pecado (1954)
Caídos en el infierno (1954) .... Empleado agencia de viajes
El Barro humano (1955) .... Manolo
Amor prohibido (1958)
Mi esqueleto (1959)
"Posesa, La" (1961) TV series
Canuto Cañete, conscripto del 7 (1963)
Orden de matar (1965) .... Asistente de Mauro
Martín Fierro (1968) .... The Guacho Envamada
Póker de amantes para tres (1969)
Los muchachos de antes no usaban gomina (1969)
Amalio Reyes, un hombre (1970)
Joven, viuda y estanciera (1970)
Con alma y vida (1970) .... Hombre en cárcel
Muchacho que vas cantando (1971)
Un Guapo del 900 (1971)
La Gran ruta (1971)
La Maffia (1972) .... Hombre en reñidero
Adiós, Alejandra, Andrea (1973)
Boquitas pintadas (1974)
Soñar, soñar (1976)
¿Qué es el otoño? (1977)
Un Idilio de estación (1978)

External links and sources

Argentine male film actors
Year of birth missing
Possibly living people